St Mark's Church, Hamilton Terrace, is an Anglican church in the leafy St John's Wood neighbourhood of the City of Westminster, London. The building was completed by 1847 and was badly damaged in an unexplained fire on 26 January 2023. It is located at the intersection of Abercorn Place and Hamilton Terrace.

History
Dating to 1846–1847, St Mark's was designed by Thomas Cundy with a spire built by his son in 1864, and is Grade II* listed with Historic England. The church contained a collection of mosaics by Salviati.

Robinson Duckworth was appointed vicar of St Mark's in 1870, after spending four years as the tutor of Queen Victoria's youngest son Prince Leopold. The Prince laid the building's foundation stone in 1877.

St Mark's survived being hit by a bomb in 1941 during World War Two, with work to rebuild its spire being completed in 1955. 

The church has been part of the Affirming Catholicism movement within the Church of England, and their main Sunday service included a Choral Parish Eucharist.

2023 fire
The church was badly damaged by an unexplained fire during the late night and early morning of 26–27 January 2023. BBC News described the church as "destroyed", noting that the roof had collapsed but the steeple (rebuilt in 1955) was still standing. The vicar, the Reverend Kate Harrison, said that the fire was "heart-breaking for us as a church and a local community". The London Fire Brigade carried out investigations into the cause of the fire. On 27 January 2023, the parish stated that "we don't yet know the full extent of the damage, but we will rebuild."

Gallery

References

External links

 
 
 

Grade II* listed churches in the City of Westminster
Church of England church buildings in the City of Westminster
Maida Vale
Burned buildings and structures in the United Kingdom